The national anthem of Guatemala was written by Cuban poet José Joaquín Palma and composed by  in 1897, on the occasion of the Exposición Centroamericana by the government of General José María Reina Barrios.

The lyrics and score were printed for the first time in La Ilustración Guatemalteca, a culture magazine, where the author of the lyrics appeared as "Anonymous". It was not until 1910, shortly before his death, that Cuban poet and diplomat José Joaquín Palma confessed that he was the author.

By order of President General Jorge Ubico, in 1934, some changes were made by pedagogue José María Bonilla Ruano to the lyrics of the anthem, since it was particularly warmongering and reflected the Cuban War of Independence, in which Palma had actively participated in, more than the independence of Central America.

It is often erroneously titled "Guatemala Feliz!" from its opening lyrics, but it has no official name and is only referred to in the country as "Himno Nacional".

History

Origins 
In 1879, the El Porvenir Literary Society unsuccessfully attempted to create a national anthem for Guatemala. In 1887, the president of Guatemala, General Manuel Lisandro Barillas Bercián, called for a competition to choose music that would complement the lyrics of the "" written by poet Ramón P. Molina.

Competition organised by Reina Barrios 

In 1896, the government of General José María Reina Barrios called for a new competition, "considering that Guatemala lacks a National Anthem, since the one known to this day by that name not only suffers from notable defects, but also has not been officially declared as such; and that it is convenient to provide the country with an anthem that, through its lyrics and music, responds to the lofty purposes for which all educated people lend this kind of composition." In this new competition, Rafael Álvarez Ovalle's work was chosen again, this time musicalising a poem written under the pseudonym "Anonymous".

The victory granted again to the teacher Álvarez Ovalle cost him the most bitter moments of his existence, as there was discontent among those who did not win, who even sent their complaint to the president. Reina Barrios, in the presence of the members of his cabinet, other figures and teachers of musical art, listened again to all the compositions that competed in the competition, and Álvarez Ovalle's was unanimously selected again.

With respect to the lyrics, the qualifying jury determined the following:

As can be seen, Cuban poet José Joaquín Palma was a member of the qualifying jury.

Palma's lyrics were officially adopted on 28 October 1896, while Álvarez Ovalle's music was officially adopted on 19 February 1897. The premiere of the National Anthem took place in the literary lyrical act held at the Colón Theatre on the night of Sunday, 14 March 1897, as one of the main points of the programme of celebrations of the Exposición Centroamericana, with Álvarez Ovalle being decorated with a medal of gold and diploma of honour.

Palma confesses to being the author 
The author of the lyrics of the National Anthem of Guatemala remained a deep mystery until 1910, when it was discovered that its author was Cuban poet José Joaquín Palma, since he revealed on his deathbed that he was the author of the lyrics of the anthem. The government of Manuel Estrada Cabrera awarded both him and Rafael Álvarez Ovalle with gold laurel wreaths at the  that year.

Lyrics

Original lyrics (1897–1934) 

 

The original lyrics of the Guatemalan anthem written by José Joaquín Palma were warlike, since Palma was inspired more by the political situation his native Cuba was going through than that Guatemala experienced during its independence: while Central America separated from Spanish Empire peacefully, Cuba was waging a fierce war against Spain at the time Palma wrote the anthem.

Current lyrics (1934–present) 

For not reflecting Guatemalan reality, Palma's lyrics were modified by Guatemalan poet and pedagogue José María Bonilla Ruano in 1934, according to the Government Decree of 26 July 1934 by the government of General Jorge Ubico Castañeda. These are the lyrics sung today.

Certifications 
The National Anthem of Guatemala has been considered by Carlos Labin, a member of the Americanist Society of Paris and the Musicology Society of France, as the "most original" of all the anthems of the American continent.

Notes

References

External links

 Guatemala: Himno Nacional de Guatemala - Audio of the national anthem of Guatemala, with information and lyrics (archive link)
 vocal

Guatemala
Guatemalan music
National symbols of Guatemala
Spanish-language songs
National anthems
National anthem compositions in F major